The Opel Manta is a rear-wheel-drive sports coupé built by German manufacturer Opel in two generations from 1970 to 1988. The Manta was a mildly sporting coupé based on the Ascona family car, akin to the Ford Falcon-based Mustang and its various imitators such as the Ford Capri. The Manta remained rear-wheel drive for both generations and also saw certain competition success. Its name comes from the Manta ray.



Manta A (1970–1975)

The Manta A was released in September 1970, two months ahead of the then new Opel Ascona on which it was based. A competitor to the Ford Capri, it was a two-door "three-box" coupé, and featured distinctive round tail lights, quite similar to those on the Opel GT and which in fact were used on the GT in 1973, its final model year. It took its name, and a few minor styling cues, from the Manta Ray concept car (1961), which also famously influenced the 1968 Chevrolet Corvette C3 (both Chevrolet and Opel had General Motors as their parent company).

In the UK market, the first Manta was sold only as an Opel: there was no Vauxhall-branded Manta (or Ascona) until after the launch, in 1975, of the Manta B1 and Ascona B as the Mark 1 Cavalier coupe and sports hatch (Manta) and saloon (Ascona). The Vauxhall and Opel models were subsequently sold side by side. (In the UK the Ford Capri niche was contested, with only limited success, by Vauxhall's Firenza, based on the ageing Vauxhall Viva until 1975.)

The Manta was normally equipped with a 1.6 or a 1.9-litre CIH engine, although in continental Europe, a small, 1.2-litre, motor was also offered. In the United States, only the largest, 1.9-litre, engine was offered. The Manta came with either a four-speed manual or a three-speed TH-180 automatic. The Manta was known to be one of the best-handling cars in its class and went on to win a large number of rallies in Europe and the United States.

The European market had a number of different versions. Most were basic trim packages, the most popular being the "Berlinetta", which was similar to the Luxus but included rubber trim on the bumpers (standard on all 1973 US Opel Mantas), vinyl roof, and other miscellaneous features. The one exception was the 1975 Opel, which offered the GT/E and a number of special editions based on the GT/E. The GT/E was a fuel-injected version of the European 1.9 L and the performance figures were very impressive for the time. The most notable special editions models based on the GT/E were the "Black Magic" (with black and plaid interior) and the "Swinger" edition in white, also with an odd interior choice.

US market
The sales approach for the Opel line in the US market differed from Europe. The Manta A was one of only a few Opel models sold in the US. Opels were imported by GM and sold through Buick dealerships and not their own dealership network, so they were limited in what makes and models they could sell there. Other Opel models sold in the US were Rekord P1 and Rekord P2 (1956–1961), Kadett A (1964–1966), Kadett B (1967–1971), GT (1968–1973), and the Manta / Ascona A (1971–1975). The Ascona A was the saloon version on the Manta A chassis and was sold in the US under the "1900" name as a two-door and four-door saloon, and as a two-door "sport wagon". The only differences between the Ascona and Manta were exterior sheet metal, glass and trim. The frame, mechanics, dash, front seats, and many other parts were shared between the cars. The Manta was even sold as the "1900 sport coupé" in 1971 and 1972, rather than as the "Manta". In 1973, the "Manta" nameplate was added to US-spec Mantas, but the Asconas kept the 1900 badge throughout their model life. The last year GM imported European-made Opels into the United States under the Opel marque was 1975. In that year the only Opels imported were the Manta and Ascona A.

All Mantas sold in the US had the 1.9 L and larger heavy duty radiator (an option on European models). There was also a sport model known as the "Rallye" from 1971 to 1974. The Rallye model was, overall, an appearance and gauge package, the most noticeable difference being the addition of a black hood, and on 1970–1973 models, fog lamps. Mechanically, the only difference was the rear axle ratios in the models with manual transmissions, and the Rallye model came with standard stiffer suspension, a tighter turning radius, and very aggressive front caster adjustments. Both had rear sway bars and a Panhard rod, providing exceptional handling.

In 1973 and 1974 there was also the "Luxus" model, which included refinements like corduroy seats, colour-coded interiors (blue or burgundy), and faux wood panelling. The only special edition Manta ever produced for the US market was the "Blue Max", in 1973. This amounted to a blue 1973 Luxus model, with a unique dark blue vinyl roof, mechanical sunroof, and automatic transmission. As emissions regulations were introduced, the Manta's engine was gradually becoming detuned. In the U.S.(1971 - 74) the 1.9 liter cam in head produced only  from a low 7.2 to 1 compression ratio. Sales were dropping as the car's performance no longer matched its looks, nor its price. As a project Car & Driver magazine added a turbocharger which effectively boosted the low compression ratio.

For the 1975 model year, all Manta and 1900 models were equipped with Bosch L-Jetronic fuel injection systems in the United States due to emission regulations. Yet in Europe, this feature was only available on the high-end GT/E models, which also sported fog lamps and lower front spoilers, which were not offered on any of the US-spec Manta models. Also, the 1974–75 Manta models had large aluminium  bumpers to comply with US crash standards of the time; European Mantas did not receive the large bumpers.

With the Deutsche mark becoming stronger, and with other costs also rising, US imports of Opels ended in 1975. Instead, the Isuzu Gemini version of the T-car was imported from Japan and sold by Buick dealers as the "Opel by Isuzu", and later, "Buick Opel". The "Opel" name was last used in the US in 1979.

Turbomanta
The Turbomanta is the rarer of the two special Mantas which entered limited production. Production was a total of 33 cars, with five of them being prototypes and the ones used for public relations.

The Turbomanta was actually a 1973 SR with a 1.9-litre "S" spec engine, originally putting out . The British company Broadspeed was chosen to build the turbo cars, and eventually started building five left-hand drive cars for the German Opel AG. These cars were meant only as prototypes. Broadspeed came up with a somewhat special solution, and used a combination of a Holset 3LDG turbocharger, and a carburettor mounted inside a big plenum chamber. The engine itself was fitted with a thicker copper head gasket, and as such the compression ratio was lowered to 7.6:1.  The outcome was a 1.9-litre engine which generated , with acceleration from 0–60 mph (97 km/h) in 7.6 seconds. All five cars were in GM's "signalgelb" sunflower yellow, and had large black stripes on the side, where a sign said "Turbomanta". The downside to this was fuel consumption. The turbocharger had halved the economy of the car, and building it was also costly. Therefore, Opel closed the project, leaving the five cars as the total production number. However a British engineer at the Dealer Opel Team (D.O.T.), which was the British importer and builder of Opel cars in Britain, was so enthusiastic about the cars that he had D.O.T. build an additional 28 cars. The cars were all based on the 1974 luxury Berlinetta model, with full gauge packs, automatic transmissions, and alloy wheels. All 28 cars were black with vinyl roofing. The only thing identifying that the car was indeed a Turbomanta was a small sign at the rear quarter of the rear wings saying "turbo". Very few of these cars still remain today.

TE 2800
The TE2800 was a totally different project that Opel refused to endorse. A Belgian company called Transeurop Engineering also wanted to increase the engine power of the Manta A and installed the 2.8-litre CIH inline-six from the Commodore in a Manta in 1971. Transeurop entered the car in the 1971 Tour of Belgium (part of the European Rally Championship; driver Chris Tuerlinx finished in seventh place). Opel had also tried the six-cylinder engine layout in 1971 and 1972 but with no success. The cars were deemed too expensive to build, and the market was overwhelmed at the time with big-engine cars.

Transeurop Engineering did not agree, and a Commodore 2.8GS engine was fitted into the engine bay of the Manta 1.9SR. The radiator, the bonnet, the front engine supports and part of the front section, the rear axle, and the transmission all needed to be changed. Transeurop Engineering turned to Opel's best tuner of the time, Steinmetz, who supplied a new fibreglass bonnet with a large bulge on it to make room for the engine, a set of widened arches, and a special front bumper integrated with the lower front spoiler, all to make room for the changes that needed to be made to the car's front end construction. Much of the front was cut out and replaced with other parts being mounted further to the ground in order to give room for the radiator. A closed radiator system was installed so that the radiator had a water tank in the engine bay (like modern cars). Originally, Opel and General Motors Continental (GM's Belgian subsidiary) was to supply the Manta bodies and engines for the conversion, but by the time the first production TE2800s were completed in 1973 the energy crisis had struck and the management of both Opel and General Motors Continental had changed. Planned production levels had been five cars per day originally; in the end a total of 79 cars were made and sold through Steinmetz in Germany, branded not as Opels but as TE2800s. Opel did not want the Opel brand on the cars and all Opel badging was removed from the cars and replaced by the "TE" logo.

The Commodore GS engine was fitted with two Zenith carburettors; this version was chosen in preference to the fuel injected GS/E engine due to its lower cost and complexity, while being easier to tune to meet various emissions requirements. A five-speed ZF manual transmission was offered as an option. Transeurop/Steinmetz also offered a tune-up for rally and motorsport use. This was only offered in combination with the five-speed manual. Some of the engine tuning parts were also available on the road car.

Although the TE2800 is the fastest Manta A ever made, it is not officially an Opel. It could outrun cars like the 911 Carrera of 1973 and the BMW 2002 turbo from 1973, even though those cars had more engine power and cost about twice as much. The low weight of the Manta bodyshell and the combination of the right gear ratios was what gave the car its success. However, the cars were very expensive, almost twice the price of a  GT/E in 1975. Very few still exist today, as most were used in rally and motorsport events.

Manta B (1975–1988)

The second car to use the Manta name was launched in August 1975. This two-door "three-box" car was mechanically based directly on the then newly redesigned Opel Ascona, but the overall design was influenced by the 1975 Chevrolet Monza. The Manta had more "sporty" styling, including a droop-snoot nose not seen on the Ascona, which was similar to the UK equivalent of the Ascona, the Cavalier Mk1. The Vauxhall equivalent of the Manta was the Cavalier Mk1 Sports Hatch and Cavalier Mk1 Coupe. Up until 1981, Vauxhall models were sold in continental Europe alongside Opel in 11 countries, resulting in the Vauxhall Cavalier Mk1 Sports Hatch and Coupe, as well as the saloon equivalent of the Ascona B, competing against each other.

Engines were available ranging from the small 1.2-litre OHV engine, the 1.6-litre CIH and the 1.9-litre CIH. Also in 1976, the GT/E engine from the Manta A series was adapted into the Manta B programme spawning the GT/E Manta B series. In 1979 the GT/E had the engine replaced with the new 2.0 litre CIH (actually an overhead cam design, but based on the CIH block) and with a new designed Bosch L injection system. Power output was now . The 1.9-litre engine gave way to the 2.0 litre S engine which was aspirated by a Varajet II carburettor. This engine was the most used engine by Opel at the time, and was to be found in several Opel Rekord cars. Opel also offered a dealer-installed tuning kit for the fuel-injected engine, promising at least  thanks to a modified camshaft, valve lifters, and exhaust system.

The B series Manta fitted 185/70R13 Pirelli Cinturato CN36 tyres on 5.5" or 6" wide 13" wheels.

In 1977, a three-door hatchback version appeared to complement the existing two-door booted car. This shape was also not unique, being available on the Vauxhall Cavalier Sports Hatch variant.

Both Manta versions received a facelift in 1982, which included a plastic front spoiler, sideskirts for the GT/E and GSi models, a small wing at the rear and quadruple air intakes on the grille. Also the 1.2-, 1.6- and 1.9-litre engines were discontinued and replaced by the 1.3-litre OHC engine, the 1.8-litre OHC and the 2.0-litre S and E CIH engines (although the 75 PS 1.9N continued to be available in a few markets). The GT/E was renamed and was called the GSi from 1983 (except in the UK where the GT/E name continued).

Production of the Manta continued well after the equivalent Ascona and Cavalier were replaced by a front-wheel-drive model "Ascona C". The Vauxhall Cavalier Mk1 Sports Hatch and Coupe did not continue past 1981, and there were no coupe versions in the MK2 Cavalier range. In 1982 the 1.8-litre Opel Family II engine from the Ascona C was fitted in the Manta B (replacing the CIH unit) making a more economical Manta B to drive. It could run 14 km per litre and use unleaded fuel. The 1.8 was very popular and was in production for 5 years (1982–1987). The 2.0S models where discontinued in 1984 and only the GSi was available with the "large" engine (GT/E in the UK). In 1986 Opel released the last Manta B model the Exclusive (1987 in the UK), giving it all of the best in equipment. Recaro seats with red cloth, grey leather like interior and the full bodypack known from the i200 models. This consisted of twin round headlights in a plastic cover, front spoiler and rear lower spoiler from Irmscher, sideskirts and the known 3 split rear spoiler of the Manta 400 (producing  of weight on the rear at 200 km/h). In the UK, the Exclusive GT/E models were available in colours such as Dolphin Grey with matching dark grey cloth seats with red piping. These also had the quad headlights, front spoiler but a rear bumper which housed the number plate, coupled with a black plastic strip between the rear light clusters. The rear spoiler was similar to the standard GT/E. Opel finally ceased the production of the Manta B in 1988, only producing the GSi version after 1986 (it was sold as the GT/E in the UK). Its successor, the Calibra - sold as a Vauxhall in Britain, and as an Opel everywhere else - was launched in 1989.

General Motors had decided in 1986 to develop a direct replacement for the Manta, despite a dip in popularity for affordable coupes and sports cars (possibly due to the rising popularity of "hot hatchbacks" like the Volkswagen Golf GTI) which even resulted in Ford deciding not to directly replace the once hugely popular Capri on its demise that year. However, Japanese products like the Honda Prelude and Toyota Celica were enjoying a rise in popularity at this time, while Audi had done well in this sector since launching the Coupe/Quattro in 1980, and Volkswagen had also achieved strong sales of its second generation Scirocco (launched in 1981).

Today, these cars are hard to find in an original, good condition; consequently the value has risen considerably over the last few years.

Rally and special versions

In 1979 work began on a rally-spec Opel. Both the Ascona B and the Manta B were used for this. The Ascona 400 model was the more successful of the two, largely due to better weight distribution.

Opel joined forces with German tuner Irmscher and Cosworth in Britain, to make the 400. Cosworth was given the task to develop a 16-valve 2-cam head for the CIH spec engine block, and Irmscher who earlier in 1977 and 78 had proven that they knew their way around an Opel building the i2800, was to design the exterior and interior of the cars. The results were not bad. Opel however had problems with the engine. The first idea of using a 2.0-litre engine and then using the 16-valve head from Cosworth simply did not give enough power. The problem was that the heads had already been built, so the heads were made to fit on the CIH type 4-cylinder engine block. So they built an unusual engine using a 2.0-litre engine block and a forged crankshaft with 85mm stroke and ended with a 2.4-litre engine block. Mounting the 16-valve head on this gave a massive output, and the opportunity to make several tune-ups for the rally drivers.

Opel delivered the first 23 specimens in 1981 which were recognizable by the 2 slot front grille (1982, 83, and 84 models had 4 slot grilles). The cars were delivered as both street cars and factory tuned rally cars. The streetcars known as Phase 1 cars, were luxury versions of the known Manta B Coupé. Although all the changes to give the body more strength were still implemented, the cars were delivered with all kinds of exclusive packaging. Recaro seats with big Opel badges on the cloth, Irmscher leather steering wheel, and even front light washers were mounted. The cars were all delivered in Arctic White colour, with White Ronal lightweight 7x15" alloys. The Phase 2 however was quite different. It had large extended arches front and rear made of materials such as carbon and kevlar to keep the weight down, lightweight doors, bonnet, spoilers and windows. The wheels were still from Ronal but now measuring 8x15" front and 10x15" rear. The engine output was  using a set of  DCOE style carburettors, and the cars could be delivered with different gearboxes from ZF and with different rear axle options like LSD. Phase 3 which is also a term used when talking about the i400s was not a factory tune-up. Many racers of the time had their garages tune up the engine even further. Some made it across the  mark and even today, engines can be tuned to deliver just over  still naturally aspirated.

The Manta 400 was produced in a total of 245 specimens following the homologation regulations by FISA (today FIA). But the i400 also spawned some other "i" models: The first was the i200 which basically was a GSi model Manta B with most of the Manta 400's appearance. 700 were made and are still considered a collector's item. The i200 used a tuned 2.0E engine delivering . There was also the i240, which is rarer as only 300 were produced, it is fitted with the i400 engine block but using a normal eight-valve cast-iron head from the 2.0E engine.

Also Irmscher themselves tried building the Manta with their own specs. The reason they were used for the 400 project was that in 1977 they had taken a 1977 Manta B 1.9S and put in a 2.8-litre H spec engine from the Opel Admiral of that time. Success was limited, even though the cars were on display at the 1977 Geneva Motor Show. The cars had been painted in some special colours giving it the nickname "Paradiesvogel" (Bird of Paradise) because of the rainbow like colour theme on the cars. The cars are considered extremely rare today.

After the success of the 400 (and i200/240) Irmscher once again tried the 6-cylinder layout. This time producing the most powerful Manta B ever released on the public market, the Irmscher i300. In 1985, Irmscher bought 29,400 cars from Opel, which were on stock. The cars had no gearbox or engine but were fitted with the Phase 2 equipment. If not for the big 1980s fuel crisis being at its worst at that time, several are sure that Opel would have adapted the idea and built a series of 6-cylinder Mantas. But instead they chose to build the economically more affordable Manta B with a 1.8-litre alloy head OHC style engine in 1985.

Convertible versions 
Vauxhall, from 1978 until 1979, offered the Cavalier Coupe in convertible format called the Centaur. Only 118 of these were made and fewer than thirty are believed to survive as of 2007. About a quarter of these conversions were built using a Manta, rather than Vauxhall basis. The cars were developed by Magraw Engineering and sold through Vauxhall dealerships on behalf of Crayford Engineering.

See also
 Manta joke

Sources and further reading

External links 

 Vauxhall Cavalier and Chevette Club - The Club for Cavalier, Chevette, Opel Manta's, Opel Ascona's and Opel Kadett's.
 www.mantaclub.org Opel Manta Owners Club UK

Manta
Group B cars
Rally cars
Rear-wheel-drive vehicles
Coupés
Sport compact cars
Cars introduced in 1970
1980s cars
Cars discontinued in 1988